Kolobov is a surname. Notable people with the surname include:

Leonid Kolobov (1907–1993), Soviet soldier
Yevgeny Kolobov (1946–2003), Russian musician
Yuriy Kolobov (born 1973), Ukrainian politician

Russian-language surnames